is a former Japanese football player and manager.

Playing career
Yoshida was born in Nerima, Tokyo, on August 9, 1960. After graduating from Waseda University, he played for Mitsubishi Motors (currently Urawa Reds) from 1983 to 1992. He played 175 games and scored 35 goals at the club.

Coaching career
After retirement, Yoshida started his coaching career at Urawa Reds from 1992. He mainly coached as an assistant coach at the club until 2000. In December 1999, he also managed the club at 1999 Emperor's Cup. In 2001, he became an assistant coach for Japan U-20 national team. Japan team participated in 2003 and 2005 World Youth Championship. In 2005, he became a manager for the Japan U-20 team and participated in 2007 U-20 World Cup. In 2011, he became a manager for Japan U-20 team again. In 2013, he signed with Roasso Kumamoto but resigned in July. In September, he became a manager for the Urawa Reds Ladies. He resigned at the end of the 2016 season.

On 11 December 2021, Yoshida was named the head coach of Thai League 1 club Samut Prakan City.

Club statistics

Managerial statistics

 A win or loss by penalty shoot-out is counted as a draw.

References

External links

1960 births
Living people
Waseda University alumni
Association football people from Tokyo
Japanese footballers
Japan Soccer League players
Urawa Red Diamonds players
Japanese football managers
J2 League managers
Yasushi Yoshida
Urawa Red Diamonds managers
Roasso Kumamoto managers
Association football forwards